Khuin (also Romanized as Khū’īn and Khvoyūn) is a village in Oryad Rural District, Central District, Mahneshan County, Zanjan Province, Iran. According to the 2006 census, its population was 36, forming 8 families.

References 

Populated places in Mahneshan County